Cophotis is a genus of lizards in the family Agamidae, endemic to Sri Lanka.

Species

External links
ARKive - images and movies of the pygmy lizard (Cophotis ceylanica)
 http://terrarienboerse.de/ag/agamen/Systematik/DGHT-AG_Agamen_Systematik_Cophotis-dumbara.html

Cophotis
Lizard genera
Taxa named by Wilhelm Peters